Kuns–Collier House is a historic house located at 302 S. Walnut Street in McPherson, Kansas. It is locally significant as an example of the Tudor Revival style of architecture.

Description and history 
The two-story, half-timbered Tudor Revival style house was built in 1909. It sits on a 0.49-acre plot of land. It was added to the National Register of Historic Places on March 8, 2006.

References

Houses on the National Register of Historic Places in Kansas
Houses completed in 1909
Houses in McPherson County, Kansas
National Register of Historic Places in McPherson County, Kansas
Tudor Revival architecture in Kansas